Chris Antonetti is an American professional baseball executive, currently serving as the President of Baseball Operations for the Cleveland Guardians of Major League Baseball (MLB).

Biography
Antonetti is a graduate of Amity Regional High School in Woodbridge, Connecticut, Georgetown University, and the University of Massachusetts Amherst. He worked in the front office of the Montreal Expos in 1998. He has worked for the Cleveland Guardians franchise since 1999.

Before the 2010 season, Executive VP/GM Mark Shapiro announced his promotion to team General Manager at season's end, with chairman/CEO Paul Dolan naming Antonetti as Shapiro's successor. The promotion was finalized at the end of the 2010 season. Antonetti was in charge of managing all baseball activities for Cleveland since 2010 including the MLB draft and free agency signings.

On October 6, 2015, the Cleveland franchise announced the promotion of Antonetti to President of Baseball Operations along with the promotion of Assistant General Manager Mike Chernoff to General Manager. Director of Baseball Operations Derek Falvey filled Chernoff’s spot as Assistant GM.

In 2022, following the Guardians playing to a record of 92–70, finishing first in the American League Central division, and advancing to the ALDS, Antonetti won the MLB Executive of the Year Award.

References

External links
Baseball America Executive Database: Chris Antonetti

Living people
1970s births
Year of birth missing (living people)
Cleveland Indians executives
American expatriate baseball people in Canada
McDonough School of Business alumni
University of Massachusetts Amherst alumni
Isenberg School of Management alumni
Major League Baseball general managers